Martina Navratilova was the defending champion, but lost in the final to Arantxa Sánchez Vicario. The score was 1–6, 7–6(7–5), 7–6(7–3). It was the 20th title for Sánchez Vicario in her singles career and her 8th title in this season, after previously winning at Amelia Island, Barcelona, Hamburg, the French Open, Montréal, the US Open and Tokyo.

This was the first ever professional tournament for 14-year old Venus Williams. Williams defeated Shaun Stafford in the first round and faced Sánchez Vicario (then World No. 2) at the second round. Williams won the first set and was leading 3–1 in the second set, but Sánchez Vicario won the next 11 games in a row and won the match 2–6, 6–3, 6–0.

The match was recreated in the film King Richard, released in 2021, where Sánchez Vicario (played by Mexican tennis player Marcela Zacarías) showed her discomfort after being portrayed as the antagonist of the film.

Seeds
The first four seeds received a bye to the second round.

Draw

Finals

Top half

Bottom half

References

External links
 Official results archive (ITF)
 Official results archive (WTA)

Silicon Valley Classic
1994 WTA Tour